Francesco Rèpaci (Palmi, 1880– Torino, 1955) was an Italian lawyer and politic.
socialist and antifasicte, friend of Gabriel D'Annuzio, 
Father of Antonino Rèpaci, and grandfather of Gabriella Rèpaci-Courtois.

1880 births
1955 deaths
20th-century Italian lawyers
People from Palmi